Killiney and Ballybrack is a former second-tier local government area within County Dublin. It was created as a township in 1866. In 1899, it became an urban district. It was abolished in 1900, with its area becoming part of the borough of Dún Laoghaire.

Area

The Township of Killiney and Ballybrack, governed by town commissioners, was established on 18 July 1866, comprising the villages of Killiney and Ballybrack. In 1899, it became an urban district under the Local Government (Ireland) Act 1898.

The urban district of Killiney and Ballybrack was abolished in 1930, with its area becoming part of the borough of Dún Laoghaire. The borough was abolished in 1994, on the establishment of the county of Dún Laoghaire–Rathdown.

Notes, citations and sources

Citations

Further reading

External links
 Killiney and Ballybrack Township layer on OpenStreetMap
 Killiney and Ballybrack Urban District layer on OpenStreetMap
 Dublin Historic Maps: Dublin Townships and Urban Districts, between 1847 and 1930
 Townlands in Co. Dublin

History of County Dublin
Local government in County Dublin
Former local authorities in the Republic of Ireland